Dragon Cauldron is a fantasy novel by American author Laurence Yep first published in 1991.  It is the third book in his Dragon tetralogy.  Dragon Cauldron marks a shift in narration from Shimmer, who had narrated the first two books in the series, to Monkey, who had up to that point played a minor role.  Yep found it necessary to change narrative voices after six years of trying to write Dragon Cauldron.  Monkey's status as an immortal made him "naturally cheerful even in the most dire of situations.  Tough and yet funny, his consciousness provided the right platform from which I could observe a world in crisis."  He had to modify the outline he had been working with as he decided that it would be necessary to kill off at least one character in order to provide "jeopardy" to Shimmer and her companions, which in turn would convey drama and emotional truth.  This also allowed him to incorporate new material based on Chinese folklore that he had researched, forming the basis for the characters the Smith, the Snail Woman, and the Nameless One.

The story picks up where Dragon Steel left off.  Exiled dragon princess Shimmer together with Thorn, Indigo, Civet, and Monkey attempt to get Baldy's cauldron repaired so that they can restore the Lost Sea, the waters of which Civet had used in Dragon of the Lost Sea to flood the city of River Glen.

Plot summary
Shimmer, Monkey, Indigo, Thorn and Civet are forced to flee the Green Darkness after encountering the Butcher's soldiers and set off in search of the Smith and the Snail Woman, the only beings capable of repairing Baldy's cauldron, which was cracked when it was stolen from Sambar's treasure vault.  They camp for the night by a lake in a wasteland that was the site of a former a kingdom destroyed by the Nameless One, a once powerful king and wizard who battled the Five Masters but could not be killed, and was punished by unknown, "terrible" means.  While getting water, Civet notices a mysterious door at the bottom of the lake bed, from which she can sense a magical presence.  Later that night the sound of weeping is heard coming from the lake.  Monkey, Thorn and Civet get pulled onto the lake surface by the needleweed plants growing along the shore, and a whirlpool is created within the lake allowing them to access the door.  Thorn and Monkey follow Civet inside, who is desperate for a means to supply her magic which has all been used up.

The door leads to an ancient tomb, within which they encounter a mysterious, ghostly woman wearing a golden tiara with a pearl set in it.  Drawn to the tiara, Civet takes it and puts it on, becoming possessed by the owner's spirit.  Imbued with power, she begins to make strange prophecies.  Despite the best efforts of Monkey and Shimmer, who soon joins them, Civet cannot be touched.  Thorn succeeds in tricking her, allowing him to get the tiara immersed in a bowl of wine and destroying the pearl.  The spell broken, the tomb begins to collapse and the whirlpool dissipate, from which the four manage to escape.  Shimmer is disappointed in Thorn, further worsening their relationship which has been strained as Shimmer appears to have switched her favor to Indigo in an attempt to help her out, at Thorn's expense.  Indigo is filled in on what happened, and after discovering the buoyancy properties of the needleweed, decides to take some of its juice.  Civet later reveals that she believes she saw visions while possessed.  Monkey discovers from spying on her that Civet believes her purpose in traveling with the group is not to help Shimmer, but rather Thorn.

The next day the group enters the Desolate Mountains, which were once part of the Nameless One's kingdom.  They get attacked by mysterious soldiers, who succeed in getting Shimmer entangled in a net.  While seeking refuge on a ledge, the disguised cauldron is nearly lost.  A sudden avalanche that is triggered sweeps them from the ledge and onto trees that had been broken loose and are being carried on a river that runs through the mountains.  Monkey ends up on a tree with Thorn, finding that despite what he has had to put up with Shimmer, he sticks by her, because she was the first person in his life who showed him kindness.  Thorn vows to prove that he is as worthy of her esteem as Indigo.  Finding Shimmer, Indigo and Civet close by, they pass by a small, strange island with an odd, egg-shaped building on it.  They are forced to seek refuge on the island in order to escape a waterfall the river empties into, and are helped by a mysterious, giant white dog.  Trying to leave, they find that they cannot fly or swim away from the island due to a magical barrier in place around it, which also nullifies magic.  Left with a boat building kit by the mysterious dog, they try various means of constructing a boat, which fail.  The dog is not the only other being on the island, but they are unable to determine who it could be.

Thorn figures out that the barrier spell is selective, filtering in certain things while blocking out others.  The group searches the egg-shaped house on the island for suitable flotation devices, but when tested none proves able to float past the barrier.  After being goaded by Indigo, Thorn throws a pebble in his hand into the river in frustration, which skips several times.  He realizes that clay is an exception to the barrier spell, or otherwise the island would have silted up.  Monkey recalls a large lamp at the egg house that might work, which Shimmer manages to save after the mysterious dog hears of their plans.  Although Monkey ties it up with rope, it manages to escape and succeeds in destroying the lamp when they try to bring it to the beach.  However Thorn proposes using multiple smaller clay jars, which they are able to secure.  Monkey finds a patch of human skin inside one of the jars, which is buried.  Finding that the jars work, a raft is built out of them, but the reeds used to bind it prevent it from working.  The glue left in the boat building kit proves to be quite strong and waterproof, so a smaller raft is made which proves successful, although it can only transport one person at a time.  The surplus jars are destroyed, and Shimmer in her dragon form manages to float off the island, helping the humans cross the river.

On a ledge opposite the island, while seeking a way out of the cavern, a mysterious white object is fished out of the river, which turns out to be the patch of skin encountered earlier.  It manages to escape their attempts to capture it, at which point Civet realizes that her prophecy has come true, as the skin is the Nameless One who had been trapped on the island.  The Nameless One adopts the name of the Boneless King after hearing them discuss him, and vows to turn the whole world into a wasteland.  Thorn blames himself for letting the Nameless One lose, and refuses to go with Shimmer and Indigo when they leave to summon the Smith and Snail Woman.  Shimmer misinterprets his intentions, leaving him with Monkey and Civet, who try to find the Boneless King, but are unsuccessful.  Leaving the mountain on foot and in disguise, they encounter a group of soldiers, who arrest them and take them to where an excavation of the Nameless One's tomb is being undertaken by the Butcher.  There their warnings fall on deaf ears, and they are reunited with Shimmer and Indigo, who were also captured in disguise.  The Butcher himself arrives, accompanied by a strange dragon.  Suspicious of them after hearing their warnings about the Nameless One, he takes a personal hand in their interrogation, which is interrupted by the discovery of the Boneless King himself in his current form, who proves impervious to all manner of attack, except for living fire, an ancient chemical substance which can burn in water that was buried in his tomb.  However he manages to release his soul as his body is burned and possess the Butcher.

The group takes advantage of the distraction to overpower their guards, while Monkey and Shimmer assume their true forms.  However the Boneless King, whose men do not realize has possessed the Butcher, casts a spell that renders them unable to fly.  Civet breaks away, declaring that she has paid her debt to Shimmer and the Inland Sea dragons.  She creates a diversion by destroying the jars containing the living fire, causing a mass of confusion with the resulting fires, but dying amidst the flames as she had envisioned.  Shimmer and her companions are able to escape, as the Boneless King's spell requires him to keep them in sight.  They are pursued by the Boneless King and Pomfret, and are again struck by the flightless spell.  Just as a fight is about to ensue on the ground, the Smith and Snail Woman's mountain arrives, forcing the Boneless King to retreat.

The Smith and the Snail Woman are informed that the Nameless One has escaped and brought up to speed.  The Smith recognizes Baldy's cauldron as the greatest masterpiece of his grandmother, the Serpent Woman and one of the Five Masters.  He agrees to try to fix it, informing them that a soul trapped within the cauldron gives it its power.  In the forge, the group assists the Smith and the Snail Woman by working the bellows.  They get the cauldron hot enough to the point where when it is struck on an anvil, the trapped soul within is released and escapes.  Determined to mend the cauldron, they try their best to get the fire as hot as possible, but to no avail.  Thorn realizes what needs to be done, and climbing onto the hearth, jumps into the cauldron, fusing his soul into it and becoming the cauldron himself.  Shimmer is distraught, but the Snail Woman realizes what Thorn has done, and encouraged, they put in a final effort that manages to fix the crack in the cauldron/Thorn.

Shimmer then tries to take Thorn back to restore the Inland Sea, but is refused by the Smith, who reveals that he and his wife plan to use Thorn in their fight against the Boneless King with the aid of the two remaining masters, the Unicorn and the Lord of the Flowers.  Shimmer, Indigo and Monkey manage to steal Thorn back by disguising him as a hammer.  The three return to River Glen to boil away the Inland Sea using Thorn, but are ambushed by the Boneless King who has rescued his giant white dog and is assisted by Pomfret, still unaware that he is no longer the Butcher.  In recognition of their repairing the cauldron, the Boneless King imprisons them instead of killing them.  As he flies off on Pomfret, Monkey and Shimmer see Thorn give a flash of light, seeming to communicate to them that things will work out and giving them hope.

Reception
Kirkus Reviews commented that:   However, School Library Journal criticized Yep's characterizations, stating that "the characters in this action-adventure are sketched in broad strokes, without the subtle shading found in his realistic stories, Dragonwings (1975) and Child of the Owl (1977, both HarperCollins)."

Release details

May 1991, HarperCollins, hardcover, 
May 1991, HarperCollins, library binding, 
February 1994, Tandem Library, library binding, 
February 1994, HarperTrophy, paperback, 
1991, Harpercollins, paperback
January 1994, Demco Media, turtleback,

Footnotes

References

Novels by Laurence Yep
American fantasy novels
1991 American novels
HarperCollins books